Omorgus brucki is a species of hide beetle in the subfamily Omorginae.

References

brucki
Beetles described in 1872